Polanisia erosa is a sticky,  high annual herbaceous species of flowering plant in the Cleome family, Cleomaceae, known by the common name large clammyweed. It has narrow clover-like leaves, and cream-coloured, frilly flowers with a yellowish centre, looking a bit like a small butterfly or a set of elk antlers. It naturally occurs in dry and sandy habitats in Texas and adjacent parts of Arkansas, Louisiana and Oklahoma.

Taxonomy 
The American botanist Thomas Nuttall was the first to describe large clammyweed in 1834, which he placed in a new genus and named Cristatella erosa. Amos Eaton included the species in 1836 in the genus Cleome as C. erosa. In 1842, Stephan Endlicher, an Austrian botanist who was the director of the Vienna Botanical Garden moved the species to a new genus and renamed it to Cyrbasium erosum, which is an illegitimate name. In 1958 Hugh Iltis concluded the species could better be assigned to the genus Polanisia, a name that has priority over Cristatella, since it was already erected by Constantine Samuel Rafinesque in 1819, and made the new combination P. erosa. Iltis distinguished two subtaxa, the nominate and subspecies breviglandulosa.

Description 
It has branched or unbranched, green or purple stems with seated glands and glandular hairs. The stalk of the individual flower is 1−2⅓ cm (0.4-0.9 in) long. The four deciduous, eventually deflected, green to purple coloured, hairless sepals are lanceolate to inverted egg-shaped, 2½–3½ mm (0.1–0.14 in) long and ¾–1¼ mm (0.03–0.05 in) wide, with entire margins and a pointy tip. The four petals are mostly creamy white, oblong-ovate, consist of a more yellowish straight and narrow claw and a wide plate. The tube-shaped nectaries are yellow, but become purple when drying and are 1-5½ mm (0.02–0.12 in) long. There are six to fifteen stamens that reach beyond the petals, consist of purple 1–1⅓ cm (0.4-0.5 in) filaments topped by purple, 1–1½ mm (0.04–0.06 in) long anthers, which do not coil when the pollen is released. Each capsule contains twelve to forty, globular to ovate, dark reddish brown seeds of 1½–1¾ mm (0.06–0.07 in), with a nobbly surface.

Subspecies 

Distribution and habitat 
Large clammyweed naturally occurs in Texas and adjacent parts of Arkansas, Louisiana and Oklahoma, where it can be found in fields, prairies, sandy hillsides and open woodland.

References 

Cleomaceae
Plants described in 1834
Flora of the South-Central United States
Flora without expected TNC conservation status